Hohen Sprenzer See is a lake in the Rostock district in Mecklenburg-Vorpommern, Germany. At an elevation of 22.9 m, its surface area is 2.25 km².

External links 
 

Lakes of Mecklenburg-Western Pomerania